Arensnuphis (in Egyptian: Iryhemesnefer, ỉrỉ-ḥms-nfr, "the good companion") is a deity from the Kingdom of Kush in ancient Nubia, first attested at Musawwarat el-Sufra in the 3rd century BC. His worship spread to the Egyptian-controlled portion of Nubia in the Ptolemaic Period (305–30 BC). His mythological role is unknown; he was depicted as a lion and as a human with a crown of feathers and sometimes a spear.

Arensnuphis was worshipped at Philae, where he was called the "companion" of the Egyptian goddess Isis, as well as at Dendur. In the ancient Egyptian religion, the Egyptians syncretized him with their gods Anhur and Shu.

References

Nubian gods
Egyptian gods
Lion deities